Goran Pandurović (born 16 July 1963) is a Serbian former footballer who played as a goalkeeper.

Club career
While playing for Sloboda Užice in the 1980s, Pandurović made over 100 appearances in the Yugoslav Second League. He was later transferred to Partizan in the summer of 1989. Over the next three seasons, Pandurović served as a backup to Fahrudin Omerović, as the side won the 1991–92 Yugoslav Cup. He became the club's first-choice goalkeeper in the following 1992–93 season, helping Partizan win the league title. Following Gordan Petrić's departure in late 1993, Pandurović was named as the team's captain, celebrating the double at the end of the season. He made a total of 115 league appearances in six seasons with Partizan, even scoring once. In the summer of 1995, Pandurović moved abroad and signed with French side Rennes. He spent three seasons at the club, before retiring from the game in 1998.

International career
At international level, Pandurović was capped four times for FR Yugoslavia between 1994 and 1995, making his debut in a friendly against Brazil.

Post-playing career
After hanging up his boots, Pandurović joined Rad as an assistant to Radmilo Ivančević in June 2004. He subsequently served as a long-term goalkeeping coach for his former club Partizan. Later on, Pandurović worked as assistant manager to Aleksandar Stanojević at Maccabi Haifa and Beijing BG, as well as to Miroslav Đukić at Partizan and Sporting Gijón.

Honours
Partizan
 First League of FR Yugoslavia: 1992–93, 1993–94
 FR Yugoslavia Cup: 1991–92, 1993–94

References

External links
 
 
 

Association football goalkeepers
Expatriate football managers in China
Expatriate football managers in Israel
Expatriate football managers in Spain
Expatriate footballers in France
First League of Serbia and Montenegro players
FK Partizan non-playing staff
FK Partizan players
FK Sloboda Užice players
Ligue 1 players
Serbia and Montenegro expatriate footballers
Serbia and Montenegro expatriate sportspeople in France
Serbia and Montenegro footballers
Serbia and Montenegro international footballers
Serbian expatriate football managers
Serbian expatriate sportspeople in China
Serbian expatriate sportspeople in Israel
Serbian expatriate sportspeople in Spain
Serbian football managers
Serbian footballers
Sportspeople from Užice
Stade Rennais F.C. players
Yugoslav First League players
Yugoslav footballers
Yugoslav Second League players
1963 births
Living people